Green woodworking is a form of wood craft or in broad terms, carpentry, that works unseasoned or "green" timber into finished items. Unseasoned wood is wood that has been freshly felled or preserved by storing it in a water-filled trough or pond to maintain its naturally high moisture content.  Green wood is much softer than seasoned timber and is therefore much easier to shape with hand tools. As moisture leaves the unseasoned wood, shrinkage occurs and the green woodworker can use this shrinkage to ensure tight joints in their work. To enhance the effect of the shrinkage, one half of a joint may be forcibly over-dried in a simple kiln while its encapsulating component is left green. The components tighten against each other as the parts exchange moisture and approach equilibrium with the surrounding environment. The swelling of the dry tenon inside the shrinking “green” mortise makes for an incredibly tight and permanent joint despite a lack of adhesives. Bodging is a traditional green woodworking occupation, where chair components were made in the woods and exported to workshops where the complete chairs were assembled by furniture makers (called cabinetmakers in the UK). Green woodworking has seen a recent revival due to its increased media coverage and the renaissance of hand tool woodworking in general.

See also
Bodging
Bentwood
Jennie Alexander

References